Morgan v Fry [1968] 2 QB 710 is a UK labour law case, concerning the right to strike at common law.

It is notable as Lord Denning MR said the following:

Facts
The Port of London Authority negotiated with a single union. Morgan, a lockman, was a member of a breakaway union. The first union threatened to strike unless the breakaway union members were dismissed, Fry arguing it was a genuine threat to industrial peace. He did not intend for anyone to be dismissed in particular. Morgan was dismissed because of the threat, and sued for intimidation and conspiracy.

Judgment
Lord Denning MR held that if proper notice, the length of time to terminate a contract, was given then a strike was lawful, and because the strike was lawful there was no tort of intimidation. The defendants’ honest belief they were acting in the interests of the union negatived any allegation of conspiracy.

Lord Denning MR said the following.

Davies LJ, agreeing with Lord Denning MR, said the following:

Russell LJ dissented in reasoning:

See also

United Kingdom labour law

Notes

References

United Kingdom labour case law